Na Bolona is a 2006 Bangladeshi film starring Riaz, Shimla, Sumona Shoma, and Ferdous Ahmed in lead roles. It is a love triangle which released on 7 April 2006 and was a success at the box office.

Cast
 Riaz
 Shimla
 Sumona Shoma
 Ferdous Ahmed
 Khalil Ullah Khan
 Sharmili Ahmed
 Bobita
 Masud Ali Khan
 Fazlur Rahman Babu

Soundtrack

References

External links 
 

2006 films
Bengali-language Bangladeshi films
Films scored by Ahmed Imtiaz Bulbul
2000s Bengali-language films